Renato Righetto (January 30, 1921 in Campinas, São Paulo, Brazil – November 18, 2001 in Campinas, São Paulo, Brazil due to Alzheimer's disease) was a Brazilian basketball referee. He was an architect by his main occupation. He refereed over 800 international basketball games from 1960 to 1977. He worked at the 1960 Olympics, 1964 Olympics, 1968 Olympics and 1972 Olympics (including final games in 1960, 1968 and 1972), 1971 Women's World Championship, 1967 Pan American Games and 1971 Pan American Games. Righetto was the lead referee in the controversial 1972 Olympic Men's Basketball Final. He was enshrined in the FIBA Hall of Fame in 2007.

References

External links
 FIBA Hall of Fame page on Righetto

1921 births
2001 deaths
People from Campinas
FIBA Hall of Fame inductees
Basketball in Brazil
Deaths from Alzheimer's disease